Komm zu mir (German for Come to me) is the second single by the Neue Deutsche Härte band Unheilig, taken from the group's debut album Phosphor.

Track listing

References

2001 singles
Unheilig songs
2001 songs